Brit Awards 2015  was held on 25 February 2015. This was the 35th edition of the British Phonographic Industry's annual pop music awards. The awards ceremony was held at The O2 Arena in London, presented by Ant & Dec. This was their second time hosting, and their first since 2001. Award nominations were revealed on 15 January 2015. Tracey Emin became the fifth artist to style the BRITs statue.

Performances

The Brits Are Coming: Nominations Launch Party
Reggie Yates hosted the launch show inside the ITV Studios in London on Thursday 15 January.

Main show performances
The first three performers were announced for the 2015 Brit Awards on 16 December 2014.

Winners and nominees
{| class="wikitable" style="width:95%"
|- bgcolor="#bebebe"
! width="50%" | British Album of the Year(presented by Russell Crowe)
! width="50%" | British Producer of the Year
|-
| valign="top" |
 Ed Sheeran – X Sam Smith – In the Lonely Hour
 Royal Blood – Royal Blood
 alt-j – This Is All Yours
 George Ezra – Wanted on Voyage
| valign="top" |Paul EpworthAlison Goldfrapp & Will Gregory
Flood
Jake Gosling
|-
! width="50%" | British Single of the Year(presented by Lisa Snowdon and Lionel Richie)
! width="50%" | British Video of the Year(presented by Jimmy Carr and Karlie Kloss)
|-
| valign="top" |
 Mark Ronson featuring Bruno Mars – "Uptown Funk" Calvin Harris – "Summer"
 Clean Bandit featuring Jess Glynne – "Rather Be"
 Duke Dumont featuring Jax Jones - "I Got U"
 Ed Sheeran – "Thinking Out Loud"
 Ella Henderson – "Ghost"
 George Ezra – "Budapest"
 Route 94 featuring Jess Glynne – "My Love"
 Sam Smith – "Stay with Me"
 Sigma – "Nobody to Love"
| valign="top" |
 One Direction – "You & I" Ed Sheeran – "Thinking Out Loud"
 Mark Ronson featuring Bruno Mars – "Uptown Funk"
 Sam Smith – "Stay with Me"
 Calvin Harris - "Summer"Eliminated Charli XCX – "Boom Clap"
 Duke Dumont featuring Jax Jones – "I Got U"
 Rita Ora – "I Will Never Let You Down"
 Route 94 featuring Jess Glynne – "My Love"
 Sigma – "Nobody to Love"
|-
! width="50%" | British Male Solo Artist(presented by Orlando Bloom and Rita Ora)
! width="50%" | British Female Solo Artist(presented by Mark Ronson)
|-
| valign="top" |
 Ed Sheeran Damon Albarn
 George Ezra
 Paolo Nutini
 Sam Smith
| valign="top" |
 Paloma Faith Ella Henderson
 FKA Twigs
 Jessie Ware
 Lily Allen
|-
! width="50%" | British Group(presented by Jimmy Page)
! width="50%" | British Breakthrough Act(presented by Fearne Cotton and Charli XCX)
|-
| valign="top" |
 Royal Blood Alt-J
 Clean Bandit
 Coldplay
 One Direction
| valign="top" |
 Sam Smith CHVRCHES
 FKA twigs
 George Ezra
 Royal Blood
|-
! width="50%" | International Male Solo Artist(presented by Cara Delevingne)
! width="50%" | International Female Solo Artist(presented by Lewis Hamilton and Ellie Goulding)
|-
| valign="top" |
 Pharrell Williams Beck
 Hozier
 Jack White
 John Legend
| valign="top" |
 Taylor Swift Beyoncé
 Lana Del Rey
 Sia
 St. Vincent
|-
! width="50%" | International Group(presented by John Bishop)
! width="50%" | Critics' Choice Award
|-
| valign="top" |
 Foo Fighters 5 Seconds of Summer
 Black Keys
 First Aid Kit
 The War on Drugs
| valign="top" |James BayGeorge the Poet
Years & Years
|}

Global Success Award
 Sam Smith (presented by Kim Kardashian)

Multiple nominations and awards

  

Notable moments

 Kanye West performance 
Kanye West was confirmed to perform just the day before the awards took place. He performed his song "All Day" amongst a large entourage including grime musicians Skepta, Stormzy, Krept and Konan, Jammer and Novelist. The entourage held flamethrowers and wore all black. However, his performance was repeatedly muted throughout most of the track for those watching on television due to the extreme explicit language featured within the song's lyrics, with the use of "nigga" being repeatedly rapped live on ITV.	
The performance drew mixed reactions from the crowd, with presenters Ant & Dec joking about it afterwards, and divided opinions on social media; some criticising West's performance and some criticising how ITV dealt with the issue.

 Madonna incident 
Madonna was the last to perform on the night, singing a version of her song "Living for Love" to close the show and mark her first Brits performance in 20 years. Shortly into her performance, a problem with her costume caused her to be pulled down a flight of stairs that made up part of the stage.

She later took to Instagram to confirm that she was uninjured, posting "Thanks for the good wishes! I'm fine". It was later revealed that her cape was tied too tightly when her dancers attempted to remove it from her neck, causing her to crash to the floor and leaving the audience in shock.	
After several seconds, she continued the performance as planned.

Brit Awards 2015 album

The Brit Awards 2015'' is a compilation and box set which includes the "63 biggest tracks from the past year". The box set has three discs with a total of sixty-three songs by various artists.

Track listing

CD 1

CD 2

CD 3

Weekly charts

Ratings and critical reception 
An average of 5.3 million people tuned in to the ceremony on ITV, according to overnight ratings – rising to 5.8 million when ITV+1 viewers are added in.

References

External links
Brit Awards 2015 at Brits.co.uk

Brit Awards
Brit Awards
BRIT awards
Brit
Brit
Brit Awards